The pharmaceutical industry in Pakistan has grown during the past recent decades. At the time of the independence of Pakistan in 1947, there were few production units in the country. Currently Pakistan has more than 800  large volume pharmaceutical formulation units, including those operated by 25 multinationals present in the country. Almost all the raw materials used in making of medicine are sourced from abroad. About 50 percent of them are imported from India.

The Pakistan Pharmaceutical Industry meets around 90% of the country's demand of finished dosage forms and 4% of Active ingredients. Specialized finished dosage forms such as soft gelatin capsules, parenteral fat emulsions and Metered-dose inhalers continue to be imported. There are only a few bulk drug Active ingredient producers and Pakistan mainly depends on imports of bulk drugs for its formulation needs resulting in frequent drug shortages. Political disturbances and allegations of under-invoicing add to the uncertainty of imports and clashes with the customs and tax authorities are common.
 
The National pharma industry has shown growth over the years, particularly over the last decade. The industry is trying to upgrade itself and today the majority industry is following local Good Manufacturing Practices (GMP) laws, with a few in accordance with international guidance. Currently the industry has the capacity to manufacture a variety of traditional products ranging from simple pills to capsules, ointments and syrups.

In 2017, World Health Organization accredited the first Pakistani drug formulated by Getz Pharma.

Companies
Multi-national companies include;
 Pakheim International Pharmaceuticals Pvt. Limited 
 GlaxoSmithKline Pakistan
 Martin Dow
 Zafa Pharmaceutical Limited
Searle companies  Limited
Abbott Laboratories Pakistan
There are around 759 pharmaceutical units  operated by upwards of 650 companies, some of which are listed below;
Max Pharmaceuticals
SAMI Pharmaceuticals
Filix Pharmaceuticals is the first company to use USFDA registered ingredients and trial heat resistant packaging in Pakistan. 
CCL Pharmaceuticals
 Pakistan Drugs Testing and Research Center (PDTRC) is first WHO-PQ Laboratory in Pakistan

Notes and references 

 
Industries of Pakistan